Lisa Coleman (born August 17, 1960) is an American musician. She primarily plays piano and keyboards. She was a member of Prince's backing band The Revolution from 1979 to 1986. Coleman is one half of the musical duo Wendy & Lisa, formed with Wendy Melvoin in 1986.

Early life 
Coleman was born the middle of three children in Los Angeles, California. Her mother was Mexican-American visual artist Marylou Ynda-Ciletti (April 4, 1936 – November 17, 2013). Coleman's father, Gary L. Coleman (born 1936), is an Anglo-American session musician, who in the 1960s and 1970s was part of the collective The Wrecking Crew and befriended fellow musician Mike Melvoin. Their families became close with each other and often played and recorded music together. Lisa formed a close relationship with Melvoin's daughter Wendy, saying once "we've been familiar with one another since we were in diapers".

Career 
At age 12, Coleman got her professional start as a keyboardist in the bubblegum pop band Waldorf Salad. The band, which also featured her siblings and Jonathan Melvoin, was signed to A&M records in 1973.

In 1975, Coleman played a small role as a high school pianist in the Linda Blair made-for-TV film Sarah T. – Portrait of a Teenage Alcoholic.

Coleman was 18–19 years of age right out of high school when one of her good friends, Niki Yoergler, who was working as a secretary for Prince's personal manager, Steve Fargnoli, brought her to the attention of Prince. After some convincing on both ends, Yoergler got Coleman an audition and she was hired as part of Prince's backing group in 1980 for his Dirty Mind album and tour. Before being so recruited, she had been working as a shipping clerk and teaching piano. She replaced keyboardist Gayle Chapman. Coleman played keyboards for Prince on his Controversy and 1999 albums and the three albums as a member of The Revolution, which were Purple Rain, Around the World in a Day and Parade, and she was also a session player for recordings by The Time and Vanity 6, two side projects of Prince.

Coleman was in a long-term relationship with her musician friend Wendy Melvoin, with whom she collaborated frequently (see Wendy & Lisa for more details). In an interview Coleman states that in 1983, one night when guitarist Dez Dickerson did not show up at soundcheck, Prince asked Melvoin to play his guitar; that same night, Prince invited Melvoin to join the band. Coleman and Melvoin became members of the newly designated The Revolution.

Shortly after the completion of Prince and The Revolution's Parade project, Coleman and Melvoin started their own musical duo, which they called the Wendy & Lisa partnership. The Wendy & Lisa musical partnership released five full-length albums for various labels, including Columbia/Sony and Virgin, as well as their own independent imprint.

Coleman and Melvoin continued to work together as film and television composers, and they provided the musical scores for television shows including Crossing Jordan and Heroes, both created and produced by Tim Kring under his Tailwind Productions banner; Nurse Jackie, which won them an Emmy for Outstanding Main Title Theme; Prime Suspect; No Tomorrow; Witches of East End; and Touch for which they received an Emmy nomination. They currently compose the music for NBC's Shades of Blue.

In 2009, Coleman played vibraphone on the Alice in Chains' song "Black Gives Way to Blue", from the album of the same name.

In 2019, Coleman self-released her first solo instrumental album titled, Collage.

Discography 
With Prince
 Dirty Mind (1980)
 Controversy (1981)
 1999 (1982)
 Sign O' the Times (1987)
 Planet Earth (2007)
 Piano & A Microphone 1983 (as composer) (2018)

With Prince & The Revolution
 Purple Rain (1984)
 Around The World In A Day (1985)
 Parade (1986)

Prince Camp/Associated
 The Time, The Time (Album) (1981)
 Apollonia 6, Apollonia 6 (Album) (1984)
 André Cymone, A.C. (1985)
 Jill Jones, Jill Jones (Album) (1987)

With Wendy & Lisa
 Wendy and Lisa (1987)
 Fruit at the Bottom (1989)
 Eroica (1990)
 Girl Bros. (as Girl Bros.) (1998)
 White Flags of Winter Chimneys (2008)
 Snapshots (EP) (2011)

Soundtracks
 Toys (1992)
 Dangerous Minds (1995)
 Crossing Jordan (2003)
 Carnivàle (2004)
 Music of Heroes (2008)
 Heroes: Original Score (2008)

Solo work
 Collage (2019)

Session work
 Joni Mitchell, Chalk Mark In A Rain Storm (1989)
 Michael Penn, March (1989)
 Seal, Seal II (1994)
 Nona Gaye, Inner City Blues: The Music of Marvin Gaye (1995)
 Doyle Bramhall II, Doyle Bramhall II (Album) (1996)
 Me'Shell NdegéOcello, Peace Beyond Passion (1996)
 k.d. lang, Drag (1997)
 Victoria Williams, Musings of a Creek Dipper (1997)
 Tricky, Broken Homes / Money Greedy (1998)
 Seal, Human Being (1998)
 Latin Playboys, Dose (1999)
 Doyle Bramhall II, Jellycream (1999)
 Me'Shell NdegéOcello, Bitter (1999)
 Los Lobos, El Cancionero: Mas y Mas (2000)
 Neil Finn, Hole In The Ice (2001)
 Neil Finn, One Nil (2001)
 Neil Finn, One All (2002)
 Hugh Harris, Flowers (2002)
 Gwen Stefani, Love.Angel.Music.Baby. (2004)
 Bettye LaVette, I've Got My Own Hell To Raise (2005)
 Shenkar, Open The Door (2007)
 Alice In Chains, Black Gives Way To Blue (2009)
 Carrie Underwood, Play On (2009)
 Carmen Rizzo, Looking Through Leaves (2010)
 fDeluxe, Gaslight (2011)
 Grace Jones, Hurricane (2011)
 Joe Satriani, Shapeshifting (2020)

Personal life 
In April 2009, Coleman gave an interview with Out magazine, where she spoke openly about her past romantic relationship with Wendy Melvoin. Coleman has been married since 2004 to Renata Kanclerz. The couple has one child.

Awards and recognition 
Coleman and Melvoin were awarded with an Emmy for Outstanding Original Main Title in 2010 for their theme to Nurse Jackie.
Coleman (and Melvoin) also share the honor of winners of a Grammy and Oscar for being part of The Revolution, as Purple Rain won two Grammys, and the Oscar for Best Original Score.

Coleman (along with Melvoin) received the inaugural ASCAP Shirley Walker Award in 2014. The Shirley Walker Award honors those whose achievements have contributed to the diversity of film and television music.

References

External links 
 Official Wendy and Lisa site
Official Lisa Coleman site
 Official Lisa Coleman Composer site
 
 

1960 births
21st-century American keyboardists
American women singers
American women songwriters
Songwriters from California
American funk keyboardists
American musicians of Mexican descent
American pop keyboardists
American rhythm and blues keyboardists
American rock keyboardists
American soul keyboardists
Grammy Award winners
Hispanic and Latino American musicians
American lesbian musicians
Lesbian composers
Lesbian songwriters
Lesbian singers
LGBT Hispanic and Latino American people
LGBT people from California
American LGBT singers
American LGBT songwriters
Living people
The Revolution (band) members
Waldorf school alumni
20th-century American keyboardists
La-La Land Records artists
21st-century American women writers
20th-century American LGBT people
21st-century American LGBT people
American lesbian writers